The Liga Superior de Baloncesto (LSB), also known as the LSB Nicaragua, is the highest level of professional basketball in Nicaragua. The league was established in 2018 and started its inaugural season in February 2018 with six teams. 

The champions of the LSB qualify directly for the regular season of the Basketball Champions League Americas, the Americas' premier continental competition.

Current teams
As of the 2021 season, the LSB consisted out of the following teams:
Real Estelí
Cacique Diriangen
Indigenas de Matagalpa
Brumas de Jinotega
Leones de Managua
Frente Sur Rivas
 Tigres de Chinandega
UNAN de León
Jaguares UAM

Champions

Individual awards

References

External links
Official Twitter
Official Facebook

2018 establishments in Nicaragua
Nicaragua
Basketball in Nicaragua
Sports leagues established in 2018